The Blunder (Czech: Ptákovina) is a Czech play by Milan Kundera.

Productions

Činoherní klub, Prague 
Directed by Ladislav Smoček. Preview was 9 June 2008, 11 June 2008 and 13 June 2008. The premiere was 19 September 2008 in The Drama Club, Prague.
Chairman .... Jaromír Dulava
Director .... Ondřej Vetchý
Eva .... Lucie Žáčková
Růžena .... Marika Sarah Procházková
Mother .... Lenka Skopalová
Schoolboy .... David Šír / Braňo Holiček
Mrs. Prušánková .... Jana Břežková
Gym master .... Pavel Kikinčuk
An old teacher .... Milan Riehs / Stanislav Zindulka
Teacher of Drawing .... Petr Meissel
Manager of Building .... Nela Boudová / Lada Jelínková
Schoolboy .... Jonáš Zbořil / Jiří Moudrý / Matěj Nechvátal / Šimon Stiburek
School porter .... Stanislav Štícha
Younger with long hairs .... Daniel Pešl

External links 
The Blunder of Činoherní klub

Comedy plays
Czech plays
2008 plays